The 1954 Oregon State Beavers football team represented Oregon State College in the Pacific Coast Conference (PCC) during the 1954 college football season.  In their sixth and final season under head coach Kip Taylor, the Beavers compiled a 1–8 record (1–6 in PCC, last), and were outscored 296 to 60. The team won the opener at home against Idaho, but then had eight consecutive losses.  The Beavers played three home games on campus at Parker Stadium in Corvallis, with one at Multnomah Stadium in Portland.

The loss to Oregon in the Civil War was Taylor's first to the rival Ducks; he resigned two days later, as did his three assistants (Len Younce (line), Ward Cuff (backs), and Hal Moe (ends)).

Schedule

References

External links
 Game program: Oregon State at Washington State – October 9, 1954

Oregon State
Oregon State Beavers football seasons
Oregon State Beavers football